Governor Roane may refer to:

Archibald Roane (1759/60–1819), 2nd Governor of Tennessee
John Selden Roane (1817–1867), 4th Governor of Arkansas